Deep is the first extended play by South Korean singer Hyoyeon. The extended play was released by SM Entertainment and its sublabel ScreaM Records on May 16, 2022, and contains seven tracks, including standalone singles released from 2018 to 2021, and the lead single of the same name.

Background and release
On May 2, 2022, SM Entertainment announced Hyoyeon will be releasing her first extended play titled Deep on May 16. On May 7, the promotional schedule was released. On May 15, the music video teaser for lead single "Deep" was released. The extended play alongside the music video was released on May 16.

Composition
Deep consists of seven electronic tracks. The lead single "Deep" was described as a dance EDM song with "sharp clap sound and dynamic bass line". "Stupid" was described as a dance-pop song featuring "808 bass slides, and unique and lively beats of percussion instruments" with lyrics about "showing confident attitude in front of those who only talk behind them with evil eyes".

Promotion
Following the extended play's release, on May 16, 2022, Hyoyeon held a live event called "HYO Hyoyeon 'DEEP' Commentary Live" on YouTube to introduce the album and communicate with her fans.

Track listing

Charts

Weekly charts

Monthly charts

Release history

References

2022 debut EPs
Korean-language EPs
SM Entertainment EPs